EPU or Epu may refer to:

Universities 
 Eastern Palm University, in Orlu, Nigeria
 Electric Power University, in Hanoi, Vietnam
 Erbil Polytechnic University, in Erbil, Iraqi Kurdistan
 European Peace University,  in Stadtschlaining, Austria
 European Polytechnical University, in Pernik, Bulgaria

Other uses 
 Emergency power unit
 European Payments Union, a defunct trade union
 European Parliamentary Union, a defunct political organization 
 European Party of Ukraine, a political party in Ukraine
 Pärnu Airport, in Estonia
 Epu, now Jeppo, a village in Finland